The 2008–09 ACB season is the 26th season of the Liga ACB.  The 272-game regular season (16 home games for each of the 17 teams) began on Saturday, October 4, 2008, and ended on Sunday, May 10, 2009. The top four teams earned berths in the Euroleague competition for 2009–10, the international basketball competition for European professional teams.

Team standings 

Team standings after 34 games.

|}
|}

Playoffs

Stats leaders

Points

Rebounds

Assists

Awards

Regular Season MVP
 Felipe Reyes - Real Madrid

MVP Week by Week

MVP Month by Month

All-ACB Team

References

External links
 ACB.com 
 linguasport.com 

 
Liga ACB seasons
 
Spain